The Maranjab Caravansarai is a caravanserai in the Maranjab Desert, located to the north of Aran o Bidgol city in Isfahan province, Iran. It was constructed by order of Shah Abbas in 1603 and located along the Silk Road, between Khorasan and Isfahan provinces.

History 

Constructed along the Silk Road in 1603, the caravanserai was used by travelers from China and Europe for many years. It was also used as a fortress, with 500 soldiers to protect travelers against bandits and to fight against possible military attacks from countries to the east, such as Afghanistan and Uzbekistan.

In 2000 Iran's historical heritage association instituted a project to repair the building, which continued until 2004. Since then it has been used as a tourist attraction.

Structure 

The  rectangular building has 29 rooms and is totally made of bricks.

The fortified exterior walls have six watchtowers for archers and scout troops.

Tourist attraction 
Being in the middle of a desert, the caravanserai attracts numerous desert lovers. The main tourist attractions of the area are off-road driving, astronomy and camel riding.

References

External links 

Caravanserais in Iran